Suppressor of cytokine signaling 6 is a protein that in humans is encoded by the SOCS6 gene.

The protein encoded by this gene contains a SH2 domain and a CIS homolog domain. The protein thus belongs to the cytokine-induced STAT inhibitor (CIS), also known as suppressor of cytokine signaling (SOCS) or STAT-induced STAT inhibitor (SSI) protein family. CIS family members are known to be cytokine-inducible negative regulators of cytokine signaling. The expression of this gene can be induced by GM-CSF and EPO in hematopoietic cells. A high expression level of this gene was found in factor-independent chronic myelogenous leukemia (CML) and erythroleukemia (HEL) cell lines.

References

Further reading